Negotiator (Chinese: 谈判官) is a 2018 Chinese television series starring Yang Mi and Huang Zitao. It is a spin-off of the 2016 television series The Interpreter also starring Yang Mi. The series premiered on Hunan TV starting February 4, 2018.

Negotiator has a 3.5 rating on Douban from over 44,000 reviews.

Synopsis
Tong Wei, a brilliant commercial negotiator, and the star executive of the US-China Business Council, is hired to represent Xie Xiaofei's company interests at the negotiating table. Xiaofei is the sole heir of a wealthy Chinese-American corporation but wants nothing to do with the family business. He vents his frustrations on Tong Wei, though their bickering relationship soon takes a romantic turn. The couple separates after Tong Wei was not allowed to be with Xiaofei. However, after time they find each other.

Cast

Main

Supporting

Reception
The reception of Negotiator has been extremely negative. The series has a 3.5 rating on Douban, with 1 star reviews taking 58.9% of rating. Although starring famous Chinese celebrities such as Yang Mi and Huang Zitao, the series failed to live to the success of its predecessor The Interpreter. The drama has been criticized for its clichéd storyline, poor acting, and depiction of workplace abuse.

Soundtrack

Ratings
 In the table below, the blue numbers represent the lowest ratings and the red numbers represent the highest ratings.

References

Awards and nominations

Chinese romance television series
2018 Chinese television series debuts
Television series by Jay Walk Studio
Television series by Croton Media
2018 Chinese television series endings
Hunan Television dramas